Lac Nominingue, Quebec may refer to:
 the old name of the municipality of Nominingue, Quebec
 a common name for Grand Lac Nominingue, a lake
 Petit Lac Nominingue, another lake bordering this village